Félicien Muhitira (born 4 November 1994) is a Rwandan long-distance runner. He competed in the 5000 metres at the 2015 World Championships in Beijing without qualifying for the final.

International competitions

Personal bests
Outdoor
5000 metres – 14:11.12 (Beijing 2015)
10,000 metres – 28:17.07 (Glasgow 2014)
Half marathon – 1:02:31 (Copenhagen 2014)

References

External links
 

1994 births
Living people
People from Bugesera District
Rwandan male long-distance runners
Commonwealth Games competitors for Rwanda
Athletes (track and field) at the 2014 Commonwealth Games
Athletes (track and field) at the 2015 African Games
World Athletics Championships athletes for Rwanda
African Games competitors for Rwanda